Marcus Jacob Monrad (19 January 1816 – 30 December 1897) was a Norwegian philosopher, a university professor for more than 40 years.

He was born in Nøtterøy to parish priest Peder Monrad and Severine Elisabeth Ambroe, and grew up in Mo in Telemark. He graduated as cand.theol. in 1840, and was appointed professor at the Royal Frederick University in 1851. Around 1850 he published three textbooks for the examen philosophicum, which were used for these courses during the rest of the 19th century. Monrad took part in contemporary debates and had significant influence, but was also controversial. He is portrayed in Arne Garborg's 1883 novel Bondestudentar and in Alexander Kielland's 1888 comedy Professoren.

References

1816 births
1897 deaths
People from Nøtterøy
People from Tokke
Norwegian philosophers
Academic staff of the University of Oslo